Columbia Business Law Review (CBLR) is a law journal published by students at Columbia Law School. It is the second most-cited student-edited business law journal and the sixth most-cited business law journal. CBLR publishes three issues each year and includes leading articles in business law and student-written notes. Every year, the third edition includes a series of student notes that survey a particularly timely issue relating to business law.

CBLR is governed by a board of third-year law students who edit the publication. The staff of the review consists of Columbia Law School students who are selected on the basis of academic performance and writing ability. Second-year staff members assist in the substantive production of the Review while also researching and writing a student note on a business-related topic.

External links
 Official website

Notable Authors 
 The Hon. Douglas H. Ginsburg
 Herbert Hovenkamp
 John Coffee
 William B. Chandler III
 Robert J. Jackson
 Richard Epstein
 Robert Rasmussen
 William Kovacic
 Barbara Black
 C. Scott Hemphill
 Joshua D. Wright
 Jack B. Jacobs
 Alicia Davis

American law journals
Business law journals
Columbia Law School
Columbia University academic journals
Law journals edited by students
Academic journals published by university libraries